Christian Muthspiel (born 1962 in Judenburg, Austria) is an Austrian composer, trombonist, and pianist most associated with jazz.

He started with the piano at six and began study of the trombone at 11. From 1987 to 1988 he had a scholarship to study in Banff, Alberta. He also does new classical music. His brother is jazz guitarist Wolfgang Muthspiel.

References

External links 
 Official site

1962 births
20th-century classical trombonists
20th-century jazz composers
20th-century male musicians
20th-century male pianists
21st-century classical trombonists
21st-century jazz composers
21st-century male musicians
21st-century male pianists
Austrian classical trombonists
Austrian jazz composers
Austrian jazz pianists
Austrian jazz trombonists
Living people
Male jazz composers
Male trombonists
People from Judenburg
Vienna Art Orchestra members